Shahrak-e Emam Hasan-e Mojtaba (also Romanized as Shahrak-e Emām Ḩasan-e Mojtabá) is a village in Kahrizak Rural District, Kahrizak District, Ray County, Tehran Province, Iran. At the 2006 census, its population was 5,394, in 1,275 families.

References 

Populated places in Ray County, Iran